Mutisia rimbachii is a species of flowering plant in the family Asteraceae. It is found only in Ecuador. Its natural habitat is subtropical or tropical high-altitude shrubland. It is threatened by habitat loss.

References

External links

rimbachii
Endemic flora of Ecuador
Vulnerable plants
Taxonomy articles created by Polbot